These are the results of the women's K-1 slalom competition in canoeing at the 2000 Summer Olympics. The K-1 (kayak single) event is raced by one-person kayaks through a whitewater course.  The venue for the 2000 Olympic competition was at the Penrith Whitewater Stadium.

Medalists

Results

Qualifying
The 20 competitors each took two runs through the whitewater slalom course on 17 September. The combined score of both runs counted for the event with the top 15 advancing to the final round the following day.

Final
15 competitors each took two runs through the whitewater slalom course on 18 September. The combined score of both runs counted for the event.

References

2000 Summer Olympics Canoe slalom results. 
Sports-reference.com 2000 women's slalom K-1 results
Wallechinsky, David and Jaime Loucky (2008). "Canoeing: Women's Kayak Slalom Singles". In The Complete Book of the Olympics: 2008 Edition. London: Aurum Press Limited. p. 496.

Women's Slalom K-1
Olympic
Women's events at the 2000 Summer Olympics